The 183rd (2nd Gloucester and Worcester) Brigade was an infantry brigade formation of the British Army.

First World War
The brigade was formed during the First World War in 1914, as a duplicate of the 144th (1/1st Gloucester and Worcester) Brigade, from men in the Territorial Force who, for various reasons, did not volunteer to serve overseas when asked at the outbreak of war. As a result, the brigade acted mainly in a reserve role, sending drafts of trained infantrymen to the 144th Brigade, and it also acted in a home defence role. Assigned to the 61st (2nd South Midland) Division, the brigade served on the Western Front from May 1916.

Order of battle
 2/4th (City of Bristol) Battalion, Gloucestershire Regiment (disbanded February 1918)
 2/6th Battalion, Gloucestershire Regiment (disbanded 1918)
 2/7th Battalion, Worcestershire Regiment (disbanded February 1918)
 2/8th Battalion, Worcestershire Regiment (to February 1918)
 183rd Machine Gun Company, Machine Gun Corps (formed 19 June 1916, moved to 61st Battalion, Machine Gun Corps 1 March 1918)
 183rd Trench Mortar Battery (formed 27 June 1916)
 1/9th Battalion, Royal Scots (from February to June 1918)
 1/5th Battalion, Gordon Highlanders (from February to June 1918)
 1/8th Battalion, Argyll and Sutherland Highlanders (from February to June 1918)
 9th (Service) Battalion, Northumberland Fusiliers (from June 1918)
 11th Battalion, Suffolk Regiment (from June 1918)
 1st Battalion, East Lancashire Regiment(from June 1918)

Second World War
The brigade disbanded in 1919 after the war, along with the rest of the Territorial Force which was later reformed in 1920 as the Territorial Army. Throughout the spring and summer of 1939, the Territorial Army was doubled in size as a consequence of war with Nazi Germany becoming an increasing possibility. Subsequently, the brigade was reformed in the Territorial Army, now as the 183rd Infantry Brigade, in 1939, shortly before the outbreak of the Second World War in September. The brigade was assigned to the 61st Infantry Division. However, the brigade never saw active service overseas and remained in the United Kingdom throughout the war, including a few months spent on anti-invasion duties in Northern Ireland.

Order of battle
 4th Battalion, Northamptonshire Regiment (to 28 August 1944)
 7th Battalion, Gloucestershire Regiment (transferred to 213th Infantry Brigade, 76th Infantry Division, 8 April 1944)
 10th Battalion, Worcestershire Regiment (disbanded 8 April 1944)
 7th Battalion, North Staffordshire Regiment (from 21 July 1944)
 1st Battalion, Sherwood Foresters (from 2 August 1944)
 4th Battalion, Devonshire Regiment (from July 1945)
 5th Battalion, Somerset Light Infantry (from July 1945)
 1st Battalion, Duke of Cornwall's Light Infantry (from July 1945)

References

Infantry brigades of the British Army in World War I
Infantry brigades of the British Army in World War II
Military units and formations established in 1914
Military units and formations established in 1939